Impulsora is a station on Line B of the Mexico City Metro system.

The logo for the station is a cart with an old hacienda in the background. The station was opened on 30 November 2000.

Ridership

References 

Impulsora
Railway stations opened in 2000
Ciudad Nezahualcóyotl
2000 establishments in Mexico
Mexico City Metro stations outside Mexico City
Accessible Mexico City Metro stations